Boy (stylized BOY) is a Swiss–German pop duo founded in 2007 by Swiss singer Valeska Steiner and German bassist Sonja Glass. The two met while at a pop-music course at the Hochschule für Musik und Theater Hamburg in 2005. The band initially played concerts exclusively, before being discovered by and signed to Herbert Grönemeyer's label, Grönland Records, in 2011.

Their debut album, Mutual Friends (Gold-certified in Germany), was produced by Philipp Steinke and released in the autumn of 2011. The band sings entirely in English in a style reminiscent of that of Leslie Feist.

In the UK, Mutual Friends was released by Decca in June 2012. The North American release of the album was in February 2013 on Nettwerk Records.

Boy won the Hamburg Musician Prize HANS in 2011 in the category Hamburgs Newcomer of the Year, and their album Mutual Friends won the 2012 European Border Breakers Award (EBBA).

The duo's song "Little Numbers" was also featured in the Lufthansa Airline's Business Class advertisement in mid-2012. In 2013 the song was at No. 4 in the Japan Hot 100.

The duo's first-ever USA tour launched on March 1, 2013 with a sold-out performance at Joe's Pub, New York City.

After a two-year hiatus to focus on songwriting, the duo released their second studio album We Were Here in 2015.

The first new music in many years, a song called "Fit Back In", was released in 2021.

History 
Valeska Steiner was born in Zurich on October 28, 1985. She grew up surrounded by music, taking piano and singing lessons from the age of seven. She took part in several bands of various styles all through her adolescence, ranging from heavy metal to African music, though at the time she thought of music more as an important part of her life than as a career path. With Glass, she declared it was the first time she felt she was creating something, instead of copying from what already existed.

Sonja Glass was born in Munich on November 30, 1976. She played the cello until she was "about 18", when a guitar player saw her on the street with the cello after a concert and asked her to play in his band. There she met some girls who were bass players and became interested in the instrument. She did not finish high school, but did study bass in the Netherlands, where she says it is easier to be accepted than in Germany.

The duo met at a six-week music course, but then Steiner returned to Switzerland and the two kept in touch rather irregularly. Glass occasionally sent Steiner songs she had just written, but for some time the two did not know what to write about together. The band was only formed two years later.

Discography

Albums

EPs

Singles

Promotional singles

Photos

References

External links

 First Avenue: Boy
 
 The Good and the Boy on HonestBlue

Musical groups established in 2007
Musical groups from Hamburg
Swiss pop music groups
German pop music groups
2007 establishments in Germany
German musical duos
Nettwerk Music Group artists
Grönland Records artists
Swiss musical duos
Female musical duos